The 2000–01 ECHL season was the 13th season of the ECHL. Before the season, the league lost three members as the Huntington Blizzard and the Jacksonville Lizard Kings ceased operations and the powerhouse Hampton Roads Admirals were replaced by the Norfolk Admirals in the American Hockey League, the league also decided to expand the regular season to 72 games. The Trenton Titans finished first overall in the regular season, and the South Carolina Stingrays won their second Kelly Cup defeating the Trenton Titans four games to one.

Regular season

Final standings
Note: GP = Games played; W = Wins; L= Losses; T = Ties; GF = Goals for; GA = Goals against; Pts = Points; Green shade = Clinched playoff spot; Blue shade = Clinched division; (z) = Clinched home-ice advantage

Northern Conference

Southern Conference

†-Tallahassee was penalized 15 points for salary cap violations (from 83 to 68), knocking them out of a playoff spot

Kelly Cup playoffs

Northern Conference

Bracket

Quarterfinals

Semifinals

Finals

Southern Conference

Bracket

Wild Card 
NOTE:  These series are two-game series;  if the series is tied at one game each, the two teams immediately played a 10-minute period to determine the team that advances to the quarterfinals.  If the ten-minute period ends in a tie, sudden death overtime would be played as if it was a standard playoff game.

* The New Orleans-Augusta series ended as a 1–1 tie;  a ten-minute period was played to determine the winner of the series.

Quarterfinals

Semifinals

Finals

Kelly Cup finals

ECHL awards

See also
 ECHL
 ECHL All-Star Game
 Kelly Cup
 List of ECHL seasons

 
ECHL seasons
ECHL season, 2000-01